Marco Mariani may refer to:

 Marco Mariani (footballer) (born 1992), Italian footballer
 Marco Mariani (curler) (born 1968), Italian curler
 Marco Mariani (politician)
 Marco Mariani (actor)